Cretatrizocheles olazagutiensis is an extinct hermit crab which existed during the Albian or Cenomanian of what is now Spain. It was described by René H.B. Fraaije, Adiël A. Klompmaker and Pedro Artal in 2012, and is the only species in the genus Cretatrizocheles.

References

Hermit crabs
Late Cretaceous crustaceans
Fossils of Spain
Fossil taxa described in 2012
Early Cretaceous arthropods of Europe
Albian genus first appearances
Cretaceous Spain
Cenomanian genus extinctions
Early Cretaceous crustaceans
Late Cretaceous arthropods of Europe